

Births and deaths

Births
 Martyn Bennett (1971)

Deaths
 Jimmy McBeath (1894–1974)
 Jeannie Robertson (1908–1975)

Recordings
 1971 "Be Glad for the Song Has No Ending" (Incredible String Band)
 1972 "No More Forever" (Dick Gaughan)
 1972 "The Boys of the Lough" (The Boys of the Lough)
 1973 "Second Album" (The Boys of the Lough)
 1974 "Live at Passim's" (The Boys of the Lough)
 1976 "Lochaber No More" (The Boys of the Lough)
 1976 "Ossian" (Ossian)
 1976 "Battlefield Band" (Battlefield Band)
 1977 "One World" (John Martyn)
 1978 St. Kilda Wedding (Ossian)
 1979 Scared to Dance (The Skids)
 1979 Days in Europa (The Skids, issued twice)
 1979 "Horrorshow" (Scars)

References

External links

Scottish music
1970s in Scotland
1970s in British music